The Man in the Dugout: Fifteen Big League Managers Speak Their Minds is a 1977 baseball book. It was edited by Donald Honig, who interviewed 15 current and former Major League Baseball managers about their careers in professional baseball.

Chapters
Bobby Bragan
Burleigh Grimes
Eddie Sawyer
Joe McCarthy
Walter Alston
Paul Richards
Ossie Bluege
Bob Shawkey
Al López
Dick Williams
Roger Peckinpaugh
Mayo Smith
Billy Herman
Luke Sewell
Jimmy Dykes

External links
 Google Books

1977 non-fiction books
Major League Baseball books